Tim Cardall (born 13 January 1997) is an English rugby union player, who currently plays as a lock for the  in Super Rugby.

References

External links
Wasps Profile
ESPN Profile
Premiership Rugby Profile

1997 births
Living people
English rugby union players
Rugby union players from Huntingdon
Rugby union locks
Nottingham R.F.C. players
Wasps RFC players
Melbourne Rebels players
Expatriate rugby union players in Australia
English expatriate rugby union players